"Colgando en Tus Manos" is a Latin pop song written, produced and performed by Venezuelan pop singer-songwriter Carlos Baute and featuring Spanish singer Marta Sánchez released on October 13, 2008, as the first single off his seventh studio album, De Mi Puño y Letra (2008). The original version of the song (sung only by Baute) belonged to the official release of the album, and the official single version (including vocals from Sanchez) to the re-edition released six months after.

Considered as the breakthrough and now signature song of Baute, the song has become his most successful song ever, and also the most successful song for Marta Sánchez.

Release and chart performance

The original version of the song was never released. Instead, the second version, featuring Marta Sánchez, has been available for download through iTunes since November 2008. The song immediately received airplay, mainly in the country of Spain, where it began 2009 at #1 and stayed at the top for a total 29 weeks, setting the record for the most weeks at #1 in Spain. The song sold over 400,000 copies in Spain.

In the United States, the song began charting at the end of 2009, being the last Latin market in which the song charted. As of February 13, 2010 the song has performed very well, reaching number one on the Billboard Latin Pop Songs and #4 in the Billboard Top Latin Songs. Thanks to this, "Colgando en Tus Manos" is one of few Latin songs ever to chart in three different years, charting in 2008 mainly in Spain and Venezuela, in 2009 and 2010 in all other Latin markets, and in 2010 in the U.S.

Music video
The music video of "Colgando en Tus Manos" is a classic ambiented piece. Filmed in Bulgaria, it shows Baute and Sanchez in various stages throughout the city walking, traveling on an old-model car, and even dancing on a theatre stage at the end. The video was universally acclaimed by critics and fans, naming it "the most impressive video of Carlos Baute".

On the internet, the video enjoyed a massive success on YouTube, where it is ranked as one of the most viewed Spanish-language music videos of all time, with more than 602 million views since its release on the website (as of June 2021).

Charts

Weekly charts

Year-end charts

Certifications and sales

References

2008 singles
2008 songs
Spanish-language songs
Number-one singles in Spain
Marta Sánchez songs
Carlos Baute songs
Warner Music Group singles
2000s ballads
Pop ballads